Acanthodelta is a genus of moths of the family Noctuidae. The genus was erected by George Hampson in 1908.

Species

 Acanthodelta accelerans
 Acanthodelta achaea
 Acanthodelta albicilia
 Acanthodelta albifimbria
 Acanthodelta alkilimba
 Acanthodelta angustifascia
 Acanthodelta antemedialis
 Acanthodelta apiciplaga
 Acanthodelta apinigra
 Acanthodelta arabella
 Acanthodelta argilla
 Acanthodelta atrimacula
 Acanthodelta balteata
 Acanthodelta banjonis
 Acanthodelta basalis
 Acanthodelta basilewskyi
 Acanthodelta bergeri
 Acanthodelta boris
 Acanthodelta brunnescens
 Acanthodelta bryoxantha
 Acanthodelta busira
 Acanthodelta caeruleoalba
 Acanthodelta canuta
 Acanthodelta catella
 Acanthodelta catocaloides
 Acanthodelta cerbera
 Acanthodelta chamaeleon
 Acanthodelta chrysopera
 Acanthodelta cinereovirescens
 Acanthodelta cupreitincta
 Acanthodelta cyanobathra
 Acanthodelta cymatias
 Acanthodelta dallolmoi
 Acanthodelta dasybasis
 Acanthodelta debilis
 Acanthodelta definita
 Acanthodelta dejeanii
 Acanthodelta demepa
 Acanthodelta demta
 Acanthodelta derividata
 Acanthodelta determinata
 Acanthodelta diplographa
 Acanthodelta distriga
 Acanthodelta dmoe
 Acanthodelta ebenaui
 Acanthodelta echo
 Acanthodelta ekeikei
 Acanthodelta euryplaga
 Acanthodelta eusciasta
 Acanthodelta exhibens
 Acanthodelta externesignata
 Acanthodelta ezea
 Acanthodelta ezeoides
 Acanthodelta faber
 Acanthodelta faberis
 Acanthodelta fasciculipes
 Acanthodelta ferreotincta
 Acanthodelta finita
 Acanthodelta flexuosa
 Acanthodelta fontainei
 Acanthodelta fulminans
 Acanthodelta fuscosuffusa
 Acanthodelta hieroglyphigera
 Acanthodelta hilaris
 Acanthodelta hircus
 Acanthodelta hypopolia
 Acanthodelta illustrata
 Acanthodelta immunda
 Acanthodelta imperatrix
 Acanthodelta indeterminata
 Acanthodelta indicabilis
 Acanthodelta indistincta
 Acanthodelta infinita
 Acanthodelta ino
 Acanthodelta intercisa
 Acanthodelta intermedia
 Acanthodelta jamesoni
 Acanthodelta janata
 Acanthodelta joiceyi
 Acanthodelta karschi
 Acanthodelta lanipes
 Acanthodelta lantzii
 Acanthodelta lenzi
 Acanthodelta leucopasa
 Acanthodelta leucopera
 Acanthodelta lienardi
 Acanthodelta lienardiana
 Acanthodelta limbata
 Acanthodelta locra
 Acanthodelta lugens
 Acanthodelta lunulata
 Acanthodelta mabillii
 Acanthodelta malagasy
 Acanthodelta mania
 Acanthodelta mariaca
 Acanthodelta marquesanus
 Acanthodelta medioalba
 Acanthodelta medioalbida
 Acanthodelta melicerta
 Acanthodelta melicertella
 Acanthodelta melicertoides
 Acanthodelta mercatoria
 Acanthodelta mezentia
 Acanthodelta mezentinodes
 Acanthodelta ministra
 Acanthodelta monodi
 Acanthodelta mormoides
 Acanthodelta mundissima
 Acanthodelta nigristriata
 Acanthodelta nigrosuffusa
 Acanthodelta nubifera
 Acanthodelta obliqua
 Acanthodelta oblita
 Acanthodelta obscurior
 Acanthodelta obvia
 Acanthodelta ochrocraspeda
 Acanthodelta oedipodina
 Acanthodelta olivaceotincta
 Acanthodelta ophismoides
 Acanthodelta orea
 Acanthodelta orthogramma
 Acanthodelta partita
 Acanthodelta partitana
 Acanthodelta pentasema
 Acanthodelta phaeobasis
 Acanthodelta poliopasta
 Acanthodelta praestans
 Acanthodelta praestantis
 Acanthodelta pretoriae
 Acanthodelta purpurascens
 Acanthodelta radama
 Acanthodelta radamana
 Acanthodelta radamella
 Acanthodelta regularidia
 Acanthodelta renata
 Acanthodelta renimaculata
 Acanthodelta retrorsa
 Acanthodelta reversa
 Acanthodelta richardi
 Acanthodelta rothkirchi
 Acanthodelta rufobrunnea
 Acanthodelta rufotincta
 Acanthodelta russoi
 Acanthodelta saboeaereginae
 Acanthodelta sakaraha
 Acanthodelta sarcopasa
 Acanthodelta schutzei
 Acanthodelta semiflava
 Acanthodelta semiluna
 Acanthodelta senior
 Acanthodelta serva
 Acanthodelta seychellarum
 Acanthodelta seyrigi
 Acanthodelta signipennifera
 Acanthodelta simplex
 Acanthodelta sinistra
 Acanthodelta sordida
 Acanthodelta spectatura
 Acanthodelta stumpffii
 Acanthodelta subvariegata
 Acanthodelta theata
 Acanthodelta thermopera
 Acanthodelta thomensis
 Acanthodelta tigrina
 Acanthodelta tolnaodes
 Acanthodelta tornistigma
 Acanthodelta trapezoides
 Acanthodelta traversii
 Acanthodelta umbrata
 Acanthodelta umbrigera
 Acanthodelta undulata
 Acanthodelta unilinea
 Acanthodelta usitata
 Acanthodelta violaceofascia
 Acanthodelta violascens
 Acanthodelta vulpina
 Acanthodelta xanthodera
 Acanthodelta zabulon

References

Catocalinae
Noctuoidea genera